John Christopher Richard Williams was Bishop of the Arctic at the end of the 20th century and the beginning of the 21st.

Born on 22 May 1936, educated at Manchester Grammar School and Manchester University and ordained in 1960 he began his career as a curate in Stretford. Emigrating to Canada he became missionary at Sugluk. Later he was Archdeacon of The Keewatin and Rector of Yellowknife. He was ordained to the episcopate as the suffragan bishop of the Diocese of Arctic in 1987. In 1990 he became coadjutor bishop and the diocesan bishop in 1991. He was succeeded in 2002 by Andrew Atagotaaluk.

References

1936 births
People educated at Manchester Grammar School
Alumni of the University of Manchester
Anglican archdeacons in North America
Anglican bishops of The Arctic
20th-century Anglican Church of Canada bishops
21st-century Anglican Church of Canada bishops
Living people